Sam Suplizio Field is a stadium in Grand Junction, Colorado, United States. It is named after former Denver Bears right fielder, New York Yankees prospect and MLB Coach Sam Suplizio.  Suplizio Field is the home of the Grand Junction Jackalopes of the independent Pioneer League.

The stadium is located just northeast of downtown Grand Junction in Lincoln Park. The ballpark is adjacent on its west side to Ralph Stocker Stadium. Suplizio Field is also the primary home for Colorado Mesa University and local high school baseball, and has been the home of the Junior College World Series since 1958.

Renovations

In June 2011, both Suplizio Field and Ralph Stocker Stadium underwent an  $8.3 million renovation project to replace the aging original concrete bleacher section along the first base line at Suplizio, along with the original bleacher section and press box on the west side of adjoining Ralph Stocker Stadium, with a new section that includes new seating for both venues as well as a new two story press box and handicapped accessible mezzanine level which was ready for use by May 2012.

Awards
 Colorado Field of the Year in 2009 by Colorado Sports Turf Managers Association

References

Baseball venues in Colorado
College baseball venues in the United States
High school baseball venues in the United States
Minor league baseball venues
Buildings and structures in Mesa County, Colorado
Grand Junction, Colorado
Colorado Mesa University
Colorado Mesa Mavericks baseball
NJCAA baseball
Tourist attractions in Mesa County, Colorado
1949 establishments in Colorado
Sports venues completed in 1949